Leonard Edgcombe (died 1696) was a ship's captain with the Hudson's Bay Company who made a number of voyages into Hudson Bay and James Bay on behalf of the company. He had Henry Baley as a chief mate for a time prior to 1692 and this mariner became an important link with the area for the Hudson's Bay Company.

External links
 

1696 deaths
Hudson's Bay Company people
Sea captains
Year of birth unknown